Panic (German: Panik) is a 1928 German silent crime film directed by Harry Piel and starring Piel, Dary Holm and Eugen Burg. It was shot at the Weissensee Studios in Berlin. The film's sets were designed by the art director Erich Czerwonski. It premiered at the Ufa-Palast am Zoo on 23 February 1928.

Cast
 Harry Piel as Mister X/Rajah von Lahore/Harry Peel 
 Dary Holm as Anita 
 Eugen Burg   
 Erich Kaiser-Titz   
 Ernst Behmer  
 Henry Bender  
 Kurt Brenkendorf   
 Jaro Fürth  
 Georg John  
 Philipp Manning  
 Gloria Maro  
 Albert Paulig   
 Josef Peterhans   
 Walter Steinbeck  
 Toni Tetzlaff  
 Leopold von Ledebur   
 Bruno Ziener  
 Max Zilzer

References

Bibliography
 Grange, William. Cultural Chronicle of the Weimar Republic. Scarecrow Press, 2008.

External links

1928 films
Films of the Weimar Republic
German silent feature films
German crime films
1928 crime films
Films directed by Harry Piel
UFA GmbH films
German black-and-white films
1920s German films
Films shot at Weissensee Studios